Nintendo Manufacturing Division is a division within Nintendo.

The division was divided, among others, into the following departments:
 Nintendo Research & Development No. 1 Department
 Nintendo Research & Development No. 2 Department
 Nintendo Research & Development No. 3 Department
 Nintendo Creative Department
 Nintendo Research & Engineering Department